Zhalantun Chengjisihan Airport (Zhalantun Genghis Khan Airport)  is an airport that serves the city of Zhalantun in Hulunbuir, Inner Mongolia, China. It is located near Chengjisihan (Genghis Khan) Town,  from the city center. The airport opened in December 2016.

History
Zhalantun airport received approval from the State Council of China and the Central Military Commission on 19 June 2013. Construction started on 16 July with a total investment of 438 million yuan. The airport opened on 28 December 2016 with the arrival of a China Express Airlines flight from Hohhot.

Facilities
Zhalantun airport has a single runway with dimensions .

Airlines and destinations

See also
List of airports in China
List of the busiest airports in China

References

Airports in Inner Mongolia
Airports established in 2016
2016 establishments in China
Hulunbuir